Andor Schmuck (born 1970) is a Hungarian politician, and a former member and President of the Hungarian Social Democratic Party.

Biography

In September 2000, he took part in the founding of the European movement in Hungary. In 2004, his collaboration with the Society was formed organization called Respect. On 28 July 2012, for the Hungarian Social Democratic Party, he was elected president of the Executive.

Personal life

He got married in 2009. In 2013, they got divorced.

References

1970 births
Living people
Hungarian politicians